Denise Cronin is a former camogie player, captain of the All Ireland Camogie Championship winning team in 1995.

Playing career
She won six All Ireland senior medals in all and 1998.

Management
In 2009, she managed Cork's All Ireland winning team and won the O’Neill's camogie manager of the year award, having first joined the selectorial team in 2008.

References

External links
 Camogie.ie Official Camogie Association Website
 Wikipedia List of Camogie players
 Denise Cronin's All Ireland diary in On The Ball Official Camogie Magazine 436 Issue 1

Cork camogie players
Living people
1971 births